Shishamo (stylised as SHISHAMO) is a Japanese band. Formed in 2010 while at high school in Kawasaki, Kanagawa, the band began releasing music in 2012.

Biography 

The band formed in early 2010, after the original three members attended the light music club during their first year of high school at Kawasaki City High School for Science and Technology. Asako Miyazaki and Aya Matsumoto had been childhood friends, but Misaki Yoshikawa met the others for the first time at high school. The band named themselves after shishamo, a type of small fish commonly eaten in Japan, however they originally spelled their name in kanji, .

In 2011 they started writing original music. In May, the band competed at the Teens Rock in Hitachinaka music contest, where they won the grand prize and the best vocalist award. After this, the band decided to spell their band name "SHISHAMO" in Latin script. The band released their debut CD in October with "Shukudai ga Owaranai", a single exclusively sold at Tower Records. At the same time, the band members became radio personalities for All Night Nippon R. In January 2013, they released Sotsugyō Seisaku, a compilation of their songs recorded while at high school, and toured Japan in March.

In Spring 2013, after graduating high school, the band members began devoting their time fully to the band, releasing their debut album Shishamo in November. On December 6, 2013, the band held their first solo concert at the Shibuya WWW in Tokyo. After performing their second national tour "Kanojo ga Dekita Bandman ni Koi Suru Kyūjitsu" in May, the band performed at nine summer festivals across Japan, and released the single "Kimi to NatsuFes".

On September 11, 2014, the band announced that Aya Matsumoto was leaving Shishamo, due to a promise to herself made in high school to leave the band when she turned 20. She was replaced by bassist Aya Matsuoka, and the band released the single "Ryōsangata Kareshi".

Members 
 is the band's vocalist and guitarist, as well as the primary songwriter.
 is the band's drummer and considered the band leader by the members.
 is the band's bassist. Originally from Osaka, she joined the band on September 11, 2014, replacing original member Aya Matsumoto.

Former members 
 was a founding member of the band, and the band's former bassist. After declaring that she would leave the band when she turned 20, she left the band on September 11, 2014.

Discography

Studio albums

Singles

Promotional singles

Notes

References

External links 

 Official website

2010 establishments in Japan
Japanese rock music groups
Musical groups established in 2010
Musical groups from Kanagawa Prefecture
Japanese musical trios
All-female bands